James Hepburn, 1st Duke of Orkney and 4th Earl of Bothwell ( – 14 April 1578), better known simply as Lord Bothwell, was a prominent Scottish nobleman. He was known for his marriage to Mary, Queen of Scots, as her third and final husband.  He was accused of the murder of Mary's second husband, Henry Stuart, Lord Darnley, a charge of which he was acquitted.  His marriage to Mary was controversial and divided the country; when he fled the growing rebellion to Norway, he was arrested and lived the rest of his life imprisoned in Denmark.

Early life
He was the son of Patrick Hepburn, 3rd Earl of Bothwell, and Agnes Sinclair (d. 1572), daughter of Henry Sinclair, 3rd Lord Sinclair, and was styled The Master of Bothwell from birth. He succeeded his father as Earl of Bothwell and Lord Hailes in 1556.

Marriages
As Lord High Admiral of Scotland, Lord Bothwell visited Copenhagen around 1559. He fell in love with Anna Tronds, known in English as Anna Throndsen or Anna Rustung. She was a Norwegian noblewoman whose father, Kristoffer Trondson, a famous Norwegian admiral, was serving as Danish Royal Consul. After their engagement, or more likely marriage under Norwegian law, Anna left with Bothwell. In Flanders, he said he was out of money and asked Anna to sell all her possessions. She complied and visited her family in Denmark to ask for more money. Anna was unhappy and apparently given to complaining about Bothwell. His treatment of Anna played a part in his eventual downfall.

in February 1566, Bothwell married Lady Jean Gordon, daughter of the 4th Earl of Huntly and sister of Sir John Gordon and the 5th Earl of Huntly. They were divorced on 7 May 1567, citing his adultery with her servant Bessie Crawford. as cause. He married Mary, Queen of Scots, eight days later.

Meeting Queen Mary in France
Lord Bothwell appears to have met Queen Mary when he visited the French Court in the autumn of 1560, after he left Anna Rustung in Flanders. He was kindly received by the Queen and her husband, King Francis II, and, as he himself put it: "The Queen recompensed me more liberally and honourably than I had deserved" — receiving 600 Crowns and the post and salary of gentleman of the French King's Chamber. He visited France again in the spring of 1561, and by 5 July was back in Paris for the third time — this time accompanied by the Bishop of Orkney and the Earl of Eglinton. By August, the widowed Queen was on her way back to Scotland in a French galley, some of the organisation having been dealt with by Bothwell in his naval capacity.

Under Mary of Guise's regency
Bothwell supported Mary of Guise, queen dowager and Regent of Scotland, against the Protestant Lords of the Congregation. Bothwell and 24 followers took 6000 crowns of English money destined to be used against Guise from the Laird of Ormiston on Halloween 1559 at an ambush near Haddington. In retaliation the Protestant leader, the Duke of Châtelherault, sent his son the Earl of Arran and the Master of Maxwell to seize Bothwell's home Crichton Castle and force the Earl, who was nearby at Borthwick, to join them. Bothwell remained true to the Regent, though it was said in January he was "weary of his part". The English diplomat Thomas Randolph also hinted at this time of a scandal involving his sister Jean Hepburn.

At Queen Mary's court
After Protestant Lords gained power following Mary of Guise's death and the return to Scotland of Mary, Queen of Scots, Bothwell appears to have been not much more than a troublesome noble at court. His open quarrel with the Earl of Arran and the Hamiltons, who accused him of intriguing against the Crown, caused some degree of anguish to the Queen, and although the Earl of Arran was eventually declared mad, Bothwell was nevertheless imprisoned in Edinburgh Castle without trial in 1562. Later that year, while the Queen was in the Highlands, he escaped and went to Hermitage Castle.

The Queen and Bothwell were by now very close. When Bothwell married Lady Jean Gordon, daughter of The 4th Earl of Huntly, in February 1566, the Queen attended the wedding (the marriage lasted just over a year). In the following summer, upon hearing that he had been seriously wounded and was likely to die, she rode from Jedburgh to be with him at Hermitage Castle only a few weeks after giving birth to her son. However, historian Antonia Fraser asserts that Queen Mary was already on her way to visit Bothwell on matters of state before she heard about his illness, and that therefore this visit is not evidence they were already lovers at the time of his accident. Author Alison Weir agrees, and in fact the records show that Mary waited a full six days after learning of his injuries before going to visit Bothwell. The story of her mad flight to his side was put about later by her enemies to discredit her.

Darnley's murder

On 9 February 1567 Bothwell left his lodging at Todrick's Wynd on the south side of the Royal Mile in Edinburgh (east of Blackfriars Street) and with accomplices Dalgliesh, Powrie and Wilson, carried several kegs of gunpowder to Kirk o'Field lodging to the south, almost encountering Queen Mary en route. At Kirk O'Field they lit the gunpowder destroying part of the building and killing Darnley and his aide.

Bothwell was publicly accused of having murdered  the Queen's consort, Lord Darnley. Darnley's father, the Earl of Lennox, and other relatives agitated for vengeance and the Privy Council began proceedings against Bothwell on 12 April 1567.  Sir William Drury reported to Sir William Cecil, Secretary of State to Elizabeth I of England, that the Queen was in continuous ill-health "for the most part either melancholy or sickly". On the appointed day Bothwell rode magnificently down the Canongate, with the Earl of Morton and William Maitland of Lethington flanking him, and his Hepburns trotting behind. The trial lasted from noon till seven in the evening. Bothwell was acquitted and it was widely rumoured that he would marry Mary.

Abduction of and marriage to Queen Mary

The next Wednesday, the Queen rode to the Estates of Parliament, with Lord Bothwell carrying the Sceptre, where the proceedings of Bothwell's trial were officially declared to be just according to the law of the land. On Saturday 19 April 1567, eight bishops, nine earls, and seven Lords of Parliament put their signatures to what became known as the Ainslie Tavern Bond, a manifesto declaring that Mary should marry a native-born subject, and handed it to Bothwell.

On 24 April, while Mary was on the road from Linlithgow Palace to Edinburgh, Bothwell suddenly appeared with 800 men. He assured her that danger awaited her in Edinburgh, and told her that he proposed to take her to his castle at Dunbar, out of harm's way. She agreed to accompany him and arrived at Dunbar at midnight. There, Mary was taken prisoner by Bothwell and allegedly raped by him to secure marriage to her and the crown (though whether she was his accomplice or his unwilling victim remains a controversial issue). On 12 May the Queen created him Duke of Orkney and Marquess of Fife, and on 15 May they were married in the Great Hall at Holyrood, according to Protestant rites officiated by Adam Bothwell, Bishop of Orkney. Mary gave her new husband a fur lined night-gown.

The marriage divided the country into two camps, and on 16 June, the Lords opposed to Mary and the Duke of Orkney (as Bothwell had newly become) signed a Bond denouncing them. A showdown between the two opposing sides followed at Carberry Hill on 15 June, from which Bothwell fled, after one final embrace, never to be seen again by Mary. In December that year, Bothwell's titles and estates were forfeited by Act of Parliament.

Escape to Scandinavia and imprisonment
After fleeing the confrontation at Carberry Hill, Bothwell went to Huntly Castle and Spynie Palace. He took ship from Aberdeen to Shetland, where he was helped by Olave Sinclair. Bothwell was pursued by William Kirkcaldy of Grange and William Murray of Tullibardine, who sailed into Bressay Sound near Lerwick. Four of Bothwell's ships in the Sound set sail north to Unst, where Bothwell was negotiating with German captains to hire more ships. Kirkcaldy's flagship, the Lion, chased one of Bothwell's ships, and both ships were damaged on a submerged rock. Bothwell sent his treasure ship to Scalloway, and fought a three-hour-long sea battle off the Port of Unst, where the mast of one of Bothwell's ships was shot away. Subsequently, a storm forced him to sail towards Norway.

Bothwell may have hoped to reach Denmark and raise an army with the support of Frederick II of Denmark to put Mary back on the throne. He was caught off the coast of Norway (then in a union with Denmark) at Høyevarde lighthouse in Karmsundet without proper papers, and was escorted to the port of Bergen. This was the native home of Anna Throndsen. Anna raised a complaint against Bothwell, which was enforced by her powerful family; her cousin Erik Rosenkrantz, a high-level official in Norway, remanded Bothwell to the Bergenhus Fortress while Anna sued him for abandonment and return of her dowry. Anna may have had a soft spot for Bothwell, as he persuaded her to take custody of his ship, as compensation. Bothwell would have been released, but King Frederick heard that the Scottish government was seeking Bothwell for the murder of Darnley, and decided to take him into custody in Denmark.

The Earl was sent to Copenhagen, where the Danish monarch, Frederik II, deliberated on his fate. The Earl was sent across Øresund to the fortress and prison Malmøhus Castle. but as news from both England and Scotland arrived, the King eventually understood that Mary never again would become Queen of the Scots. Without Mary, the King considered him insignificant.

Death
He was held in what were said to be appalling conditions. He died in April 1578. He was buried in a vault at Fårevejle church near the castle.

A pillar to which he was chained for the last ten years of his life can still be seen, with a circular groove in the floor around the pillar.

In 1858 the body was exhumed and declared to be that of Bothwell. It was in a dried condition and was thereafter referred to as "Bothwell's mummy". His extended family tried to get his body sent back to Scotland, but their request has not been granted. The identity of the body has never been conclusively proven.

A body referred to as "Bothwell's mummy" materialised in 1976 in the Edinburgh Wax Museum on the Royal Mile, as the only non-wax exhibit. The guide book claimed it was brought to Scotland in 1858.

See also
 Casket letters
 Gunpowder, Treason & Plot

References

External links
 

|-

|-

1530s births
1578 deaths
16th-century Scottish peers
16th-century Scottish military personnel
Lord High Admirals of Scotland
Orkney
James Hepburn, 4th Earl
People associated with Orkney
Members of the Privy Council of Scotland
Privy Council of Mary, Queen of Scots
Scottish people who died in prison custody
Scottish Protestants
Prisoners who died in Danish detention
Husbands of Mary, Queen of Scots